"Sky High" is a song by British band Jigsaw. It was released as a single in 1975 and was the main title theme to the film The Man from Hong Kong. The song was a worldwide hit in the latter part of 1975, reaching No. 3 on the Billboard Hot 100 and No. 4 on the Adult Contemporary chart in the United States. It was composed by Clive Scott and Des Dyer of Jigsaw. The orchestral arrangement was by Richard Hewson. It was also a top 10 single on the UK Singles Chart.
The 1975 Australian single was released under the name "British Jigsaw" due to an established and popular local band there at the time also called "Jigsaw".

Two years later, the song gained more striking commercial success in Japan, peaking at No. 2 on the Oricon singles chart and selling approximately 570,000 copies. ZYX Records released an extended 12" version in 1987. A remixed version of the original Jigsaw cut by PWL remixer Pete Hammond was a minor dance hit in the US in the spring of 1989. In a nod to the original 7" single release, "Brand New Love Affair" was also remixed and put on the B-side, but managed to reach No. 66 on the Billboard Hot 100 the following year. The song has been popular in Mexico because of the song's affiliation with Mil Máscaras, a popular luchador enmascarado (masked professional wrestler) who used the song for his entrances.

Notable cover versions
 A cover version in French was recorded in 1975 by Éric Estève who also contributed the lyrics, under the title "Plus haut que le soleil".
 British singer Newton covered "Sky High" and released it as a single on 14 November 1994. His version, produced by Mike Stock and Matt Aitken, became a hit, reaching number eight on the Australian Singles Chart.

Chart history

Jigsaw version

Year-end charts

Newton version

See also
List of 1970s one-hit wonders in the United States

References

External links
 

1975 singles
Oricon International Singles Chart number-one singles
British disco songs
British pop songs
1975 songs
Songs written by Clive Scott